(1812–1876), also known as , was a Japanese painter of the late-Edo, Bakumatsu, and early-Meiji periods.

Life
Born to a hair-dresser in Kōchi in 1812, Kinzō studied under  before joining the retinue of a Yamauchi princess on her journey to Edo in 1829. However, accused by a rival of forging a work by Kanō Tan'yū, he was dismissed from his post. Little is known of his next ten years. Subsequently prolific, his surviving works include 70 shibai-e byōbu on theatrical subjects, nine ema, thirteen , two emakimono, and seven warai-e or shunga. He also had many disciples.

Ekin Museum

The  is located in Kōnan in Kōchi Prefecture. Twenty-three of his  are stored in the museum, with two visible through peepholes throughout the year.

Ekin Festival
On the third weekend in July, his folding screens on dramatic subjects are displayed at night by candlelight in the streets of Akaoka in Kōnan.

See also
 List of Cultural Properties of Japan - paintings (Kōchi)

References

External links

  Ekin Museum
  Paintings by Ekin

People of Edo-period Japan
1812 births
1876 deaths
19th-century Japanese painters
People from Kōchi Prefecture